The 16th Annual Australian Recording Industry Association Music Awards (generally known as ARIA Music Awards or simply The ARIAs) were held on 15 October 2002 at the Sydney SuperDome.

Awards

ARIA Awards
Winners highlighted in bold with nominations below them in plain.
Album of the Year
Kasey Chambers – Barricades & Brickwalls	
Alex Lloyd – Watching Angels Mend
george – Polyserena
Kylie Minogue – Fever
Silverchair – Diorama
Single of the Year
Kylie Minogue – "Can't Get You Out of My Head"	
Alex Lloyd – "Amazing"
Grinspoon – "Chemical Heart"
Kasey Chambers – "Not Pretty Enough"
The Vines – "Get Free"
Highest Selling Album
Kylie Minogue – Fever	
Alex Lloyd – Watching Angels Mend
Kasey Chambers – Barricades & Brickwalls
Nikki Webster – Follow Your Heart
The 12th Man – The Final Dig?
Highest Selling Single
Kylie Minogue – "Can't Get You Out of My Head"	
Alex Lloyd – "Amazing"
Holly Valance – "Kiss Kiss"
Kasey Chambers – "Not Pretty Enough"
Shakaya – "Stop Calling Me"
Best Group
Silverchair – Diorama
george – Polyserena
Grinspoon – New Detention
Powderfinger – "The Metre/Waiting for the Sun"
The Vines – Highly Evolved
Best Female Artist
Kasey Chambers – Barricades & Brickwalls	
Holly Valance – "Kiss Kiss"
Kylie Minogue – Fever
Lisa Miller – Car Tape
Natalie Imbruglia – White Lilies Island
Best Male Artist
Alex Lloyd – Watching Angels Mend	
Dan Brodie – Empty Arms Broken Hearts
Darren Hayes – Spin
Paul Kelly – Nothing But a Dream
Paul Mac – 3000 Feet High
Breakthrough Artist – Album
george – Polyserena	
1200 Techniques – Choose One
Dan Brodie & The Broken Arrows – Empty Arms Broken Hearts
Eskimo Joe – Girl
The Vines – Highly Evolved
Breakthrough Artist – Single
The Vines – "Get Free"	
1200 Techniques – "Karma (What Goes Around)"
Holly Valance – "Kiss Kiss"
Machine Gun Fellatio – "Girl of My Dreams (Is Giving Me Nightmares)"
The Waifs – "London Still"
Best Pop Release
Kylie Minogue – Fever
Disco Montego – "Beautiful"
george – Polyserena
Holly Valance – "Kiss Kiss"
The Whitlams – Torch the Moon
Best Dance Release
Paul Mac – 3000 Feet High	
1200 Techniques – "Karma (What Goes Around)"
Gerling – "Dust Me Selecta"
Katalyst – Manipulating Agent
[Love] Tattoo – [Love] Tattoo
Best Rock Album
Silverchair – Diorama
Alex Lloyd – Watching Angels Mend
Grinspoon – New Detention
Motor Ace – Shoot This
The Vines – Highly Evolved
Best Country Album
Kasey Chambers – Barricades & Brickwalls	
Adam Harvey – Workin' Overtime
Catherine Britt – Dusty Smiles and Heartbreak Cures
Lee Kernaghan – Electric Rodeo
Troy Cassar-Daley – Long Way Home
Best Independent Release
1200 Techniques – Karma (What Goes Around)	
Icecream Hands – "Rain Hail Shine"
Killing Heidi – Heavensent
Lisa Miller – Car Tape
The Waifs – "London Still"
Best Adult Contemporary Album
Paul Kelly – Nothing But a Dream	
Archie Roach – Sensual Being
Jimmy Little – Resonate
Lisa Miller – Car Tape
Vika and Linda – Love is Mighty Close
Best Blues & Roots Album
Jeff Lang & Bob Brozman – Rolling Through This World	
Backsliders – Hanoi
Bondi Cigars – Down in the Valley
Dave Steel – Home Is a Hard Thing to Find
Mick Hart – Upside Down in the Full Face of Optimism
Best Children's Album
Hi-5 – Boom Boom Beat
The Hooley Dooleys – Roll Up! Roll Up!
The Star Girls – The Star Girls from Planet Groove
Tasmanian Symphony Orchestra, Sean O'Boyle – Symphony of Lullabies
The Wiggles – Wiggly Safari
Best Comedy Release
The 12th Man – The Final Dig?	
The Drugs – The Bold and The Beautiful
Kevin Bloody Wilson – The Second Kumin' of Kev
"Slamming" Sam Kekovich – You Know It Makes Sense
The Umbilical Brothers – "Don't Dance to This"

Fine Arts Awards
Best Jazz Album
Andrea Keller – Thirteen Sketches	
Dale Barlow – Dale Barlow Live
James Morrison – Scream Machine
James Muller – Thrum
The Umbrellas – Bravo Nino Rota
Best Classical Album
Slava Grigoryan – Sonatas & Fantasies	
David Hobson – Handel: Arias
Genevieve Lacey, Linda Kent – Piracy
Geoffrey Lancaster – Haydn: Keyboard Sonatas Volume 1
Yvonne Kenny, Adelaide Symphony Orchestra – Gorecki: Symphony No. 3
Best Original Cast / Show Production Recording
Various – The Man from Snowy River: Arena Spectacular	
Judi Connelli – Back to Before
Opera Australia, Simone Young – Verdi: Requiem
Original Australian Cast Recording – The Wizard of Oz
Play Act One – Story of Abbey
Best Original Soundtrack Production Recording
Paul Kelly, Shane O' Mara, Steve Hadley, Bruce Haymes, Peter Luscombe – Lantana	
Graham Tardif & Rolf de Heer (composers), Archie Roach (performer) – The Tracker
David Thrussell – The Hard Word
Mario Millo – Changi
Various – Dirty Deeds
Best World Music Album
Monsieur Camembert – Live on Stage	
Coda – There Is a Way to Fly
Kim Sanders – You Can't Get There From Here
Nabarlek – Bininj Manborlh / Blackfella Road
Various – Corroboration

Artisan Awards
Producer of the Year
Daniel Johns – Silverchair – Diorama	
Alex Lloyd, Magnus Fiennes – Alex Lloyd – Watching Angels Mend
Daniel Denholm – The Whitlams – Torch the Moon
David Nicholas, george – george – Polyserena
Gerling, Magoo – Gerling – When Young Terrorists Chase the Sun
Phil McKellar – Grinspoon – New Detention
Richard Pleasance & Paul Kelly – Archie Roach – Sensual Being
Engineer of the Year
Anton Hagop – Silverchair – Diorama	
Adam Rhodes & DW Norton – Superheist – "A Dignified Rage"
Daniel Denholm – The Whitlams – Torch the Moon
Paul Mac – Paul Mac – 3000 Feet High
Phil McKellar – Grinspoon – Chemical Heart
Best Video
Michael Gracey, Babyfoot Productions – 1200 Techniques – "Karma (What Goes Around)"	
Jolyon Watkins – Gerling – "Dust Me Selecta"
Michael Spiccia, Prodigy Films – Disco Montego – "Beautiful"
Nash Edgerton – Eskimo Joe – "Liar"
Square-Eyed Films – Silverchair – "The Greatest View"
Best Cover Art
Darren Glindemann, John Watson, Melissa Chenery, Daniel Johns – Silverchair – Diorama	
Art of the State, Scott James Smith – The Whitlams – Torch the Moon
Campbell Murray Creating – Kasey Chambers – Barricades & Brickwalls
Chris Von Sanden – george – Polyserena
Craig Nicholls – The Vines – Highly Evolved

Outstanding Achievement Award
Kylie Minogue

ARIA Hall of Fame inductee
Inducted into the ARIA Hall of Fame was:
Olivia Newton-John

See also
Music of Australia

References

External links
ARIA Awards official website
List of 2002 winners

ARIA Music Awards
2002 in Australian music
2002 music awards